Bloomsbury 21 is a series of 21 books published in 2007 by Bloomsbury to celebrate their 21st anniversary. The books are limited editions of 21 of Bloomsbury's most famous published works. The books have covers featuring a white background with a picture of the original cover of the particular book, tilted in such a way that part of the picture is cut off and appears on the next book in the series. When the books are placed side by side in numerical order, their covers form a panorama of the 21 original book covers. Each book features an introduction by a fellow author and reading group guides. On the spine of each book is its number in the series above the number 21 to indicate the book's place within the series. Authors whose works have been included in the series include Margaret Atwood and J.K. Rowling.

Books
The 21 books in the series are listed here:

External links
 Official website of the series

British literature
Lists of books
Lists of British books